Pastor Gong Shengliang (龚圣亮) is the founder and leader of the South China Church, an evangelical house-church fellowship with some 50,000 members across several provinces. In December 2001, he was convicted and sentenced to death under China's anti-cult legislation. Responding to international pressure, China dropped the religious charge and the death penalty and ordered a re-trial. Pastor Gong was convicted of multiple counts of rape and given a life sentence.

Religious persecution 
He was sentenced to death in 2001, but because of international pressure, the sentence was reduced to life. Some who testified against Gong later stated that they were tortured into doing so by Communist officials. Liu Xianzhi, a former leader in the South China Church, has sought asylum in the United States and gives extensive testimony on the details of Pastor Gong Shengliang's case.  There are also reports that he has been beaten and mistreated in prison. Over several weeks in late May and early June 2003, it was reported that he lapsed in and out of a coma and was bleeding internally, and that he nearly died from a savage beating in prison in June 2003.

In 2013 Pastor Shengliang's daughter in an open letter to Xi Jinping, General Secretary of the Communist Party of China, asked for his help. According to her, her father had not received medical treatment over the past ten years. His condition is now life-threatening. A heart attack at the end of 2012 left him unable to walk or speak. His daughter is asking for his release to receive urgent medical treatment.

See also

 List of China-related topics
 List of Chinese people

External links
Amnesty International
John Mark Ministries
Chinese Embassy in the US
Gao Ying's comments on Gong Shengliang
Comments from the National Agency for Religious Affairs of China
ChinaAid.org Testimony of Liu Xianzhi
PrisonerAlert.com

Living people
Chinese dissidents
People from Xiangyang
Chinese Christian clergy
Chinese prisoners sentenced to life imprisonment
Prisoners sentenced to life imprisonment by the People's Republic of China
Chinese prisoners sentenced to death
Prisoners sentenced to death by the People's Republic of China
Year of birth missing (living people)
Chinese religious leaders